"Good Friday" (aka Good Friday / Good Feelings [re-mix]) is a 1983 song by Modern Romance. It was taken from their album Party Tonight.

Formats
7-inch single
"Good Friday" 
"Good Feelings" [re-mix]
12-inch single
"Good Friday" 
"Good Feelings" [re-mix]
"Love Letters" [cover version]

Chart position
UK Singles Chart #96

History
Good Friday had started to lose the party-Latin style, giving way to more experimental pop tunes like the mambo-esque "Don't Stop That Crazy Rhythm" and the bluesy "Walking in the Rain". Both of these tunes made the Top 20 on the UK Chart. However, "Good Friday" seemed like a return to hits such as "Best Year of Our Lives" and "High Life" - and to further punctuate this, their Trick of the Light party track, "Good Feelings", was included as a double A-side, albeit re-mixed. The song underperformed, climbing to only #96. It was released simultaneously with the compilation album Party Tonight which fared well. Party Tonight was the highest-charting album for Modern Romance. "Good Friday" shared exactly the same cover as Party Tonight; it was released in two formats: a 7-inch single and 12-inch single by WEA. Tony Visconti served as producer. The reverse side of the 12-inch vinyl featured another album track and cover version from Party Tonight, "Love Letters".

Albums (featured on)
Party Tonight compilation album (1983)
Modern Romance: The Platinum Collection compilation album (2006)

Genre
"Good Friday" - and its B-side Good Feelings - are a mix of pop music and party music with a hint of their signature traditional salsa music style. It was the final single to feature John Du Prez.

Personnel
Michael J. Mullins - vocals
David Jaymes - bass guitar
Robbie Jaymes - synthesizer
Paul Gendler - guitar
John Du Prez - trumpet
Andy Kyriacou - drums
Tony Visconti - producer (music)

References

1983 singles
Modern Romance (band) songs
Song recordings produced by Tony Visconti
1983 songs
Warner Music Group singles
Songs written by Michael J. Mullins